Yazdanabad (also Romanized as Yazdānābād) is a village in Shahidabad Rural District, Bandpey-ye Gharbi District, Babol County, Mazandaran Province, Iran. At the 2006 census, its population was 64, in 16 families.

References 

Populated places in Babol County